Dee Road is one of two commuter railroad stations on Metra's Union Pacific Northwest Line in the city of Park Ridge, Illinois.

As of April 25, 2022, Dee Road is served by 44 trains (22 in each direction) on weekdays, by 31 trains (16 inbound, 15 outbound) on Saturdays, and by 19 trains (nine inbound, 10 outbound) on Sundays.

The station was rebuilt in 2006 as a replacement for the former station on the opposite side of Dee Road, built by the Chicago and North Western Railway in 1967.

The smaller parking area between Dee Road and Rowe Avenue, where the old station used to be, was recommended by Metra, as well as parking at nearby . Bus connections are provided by Pace.

Bus connections

Pace
  209 Busse Highway (weekdays only) 
  226 Oakton Street (weekdays only) 
  240 Dee Road (weekday rush hours only)

References

External links
 Metra - Dee Road Station
 Dee Road Station (Homer L. Chastain & Associates)
 Station from Dee Road from Google Maps Street View
 Station from Oakton Street from Google Maps Street View

Dee Road
Dee Road Station
Former Chicago and North Western Railway stations
Railway stations in the United States opened in 1967
Railway stations in Cook County, Illinois